Al-Shuhayl is a Syrian town located in Deir ez-Zor District, Deir ez-Zor.  According to the Syria Central Bureau of Statistics (CBS), Al-Shuhayl had a population of 14,005 in the 2004 census.

References 

Populated places in Deir ez-Zor Governorate
Populated places on the Euphrates River